OUA or Oua may refer to:

Organisations
Open Universities Australia, an online higher education organization based in Australia
Organisation of African Unity, now replaced by the African Union
Ontario University Athletics, a regional membership association for Canadian universities

Places
Oua, an island in Tuvalu
Oua River, a river in Gabon
'O'ua, an island in Tonga
Ouagadougou Airport (IATA code)